Oceguera is a surname. Notable people with the surname include:

 John Oceguera (born 1968), Native American politician from Nevada
 Gina Oceguera (born 1977), Mexican-American soccer player

Spanish-language surnames